Soundtracks from the Shaolin Temple is a 2008 album by various artists affiliated with or part of the Wu-Tang Clan.  A majority of the tracks are produced by Bronze Nazareth and one is produced by Wu-Tang member RZA.  Seven members of the Wu-Tang Clan make appearances on the album along with over 20 affiliates.

Track listing 

Albums produced by Bronze Nazareth
2008 compilation albums
Wu-Tang Clan albums